The following is a list of the monastic houses in Hampshire, England.

See also
 List of monastic houses in England

Notes

References

Medieval sites in England
Hampshire
Lists of buildings and structures in Hampshire
Hampshire